Stenaspis plagiata is a species of beetle in the family Cerambycidae. It was described by Waterhouse in 1877.

References

Trachyderini
Beetles described in 1877